The men's basketball tournament at the 2015 Southeast Asian Games was held in Kallang, Singapore at the OCBC Arena Hall 1 from 9 to 15 June.

 made their international debut, after being accepted to FIBA in 2013.

The  defended its gold medal for the tenth straight time.

The official detailed schedule for the tournament was announced on 30 April 2015.

Draw
The draw was held on 30 April 2015 at the OCBC Arena Hall 1 during the 2015 SEABA Championship. Singapore coach Neo Beng Siang was satisfied with the draw, pointing out that they avoided the Philippines and Malaysia until the knockout round.

Team rosters
At the start of tournament, all nine participating countries had up to 12 players on their rosters.

Competition format
The preliminary round will be composed of two groups of either four or five teams each. Each team will play the teams within their group. The top two teams per group will advance to the knockout round. The other teams qualify to the classification round.
Classification round:
5th place: Third place teams play for fifth place.
7th place: Fourth place teams play for seventh place.
8th place: Fifth place team in Group B play for ninth place against the loser of the seventh place match.
The knockout round is a single-elimination tournament, with a consolation game for the semifinals losers. In the knockout round, the winner of the third place game wins the bronze medal; the loser in the final is awarded the silver medal, while the winner wins the gold medal.

Results
All times are Singapore Standard Time (UTC+8)

Preliminary round

Group A
The Philippines won all three preliminary round games, including a 105-point victory against debutants Timor-Leste. The game between Indonesia and Malaysia determined the other semifinalist from this group, a game where Indonesia came from behind to win handily.

Group B
Singapore won all four games to top the group, including the game against Thailand where Singapore closed out the third quarter with a 5–0 run to seal the win. The game determined which team will top the group. Cambodia, Vietnam and Myanmar were all eliminated from contention.

Classification round

7th place match

5th–6th place match

8th–9th place match

Knockout round

Semifinals
The Thais opened the semifinals against the Philippines with an 11-point lead at halftime, the first time in the tournament that the Filipinos found themselves trailing at that point. Almond Vosotros scored on several three-pointers to help the Philippines trim the deficit. Kiefer Ravena scored on a three-point shot of his own with 16.5 seconds remaining in the game to advance to the gold medal game.

In their semifinal, Mario Wuysang led indonesia to a 12-point lead at halftime. The Singaporeans were frustrated by poor shooting. At the start of the third quarter, Indonesia lead increased to 19 points. However, Desmond Oh was taken out of the game due to a suspected concussion, and Singapore never had a fourth quarter run that saw Indonesia winning the game to face the Philippines for the gold medal.

Bronze medal match
In the bronze medal game, the game started with both teams deadlocked after the first period. Thailand outscored the hosts in the second quarter to lead by six at the half. Singapore caught up with the Thais tying the game anew early in the fourth quarter at 41-all. The teams traded baskets, but Singapore converted several free-throws to seize a 5-point lead. Singapore maintained the lead until the end of the game to win the bronze medal.

Gold medal match
Earlier in the tournament, the Philippines defeated Indonesia 81–52. The Filipinos started the game with a 7-point lead in the first quarter, and controlled the game until Indonesia had a 9–1 run midway through the fourth quarter to cut the lead to three. Ravena scored on a dunk to restore the five-point lead, and Mark Belo converted a couple of free-throws late in the fourth quarter to win the country's 29th gold medal in 2015 games, and the 17th gold medal out of 18 men's basketball tournaments.

Final standings

See also
Women's tournament

References

Men
2014–15 in Philippine basketball
2014–15 in Malaysian basketball
2014–15 in Indonesian basketball
2014–15 in Thai basketball
2014–15 in Singaporean basketball
2014–15 in Vietnamese basketball
2015 in Burmese sport
2015 in Cambodian sport
2015 in East Timorese sport